Photodermatoses is a skin disease that is caused by exposure to sunlight. People with photodermatoses may develop skin rashes following exposure to the sun. Polymorphous light eruption is the most common type of photodermatoses. It is most likely due to an abnormal immune system reaction to the sun. Polymorphous light eruption occurs in approximately 10 to 20 percent of otherwise healthy individuals, so it is a relatively common condition.

References

Skin conditions resulting from physical factors